For the teacher of Abu Madyan see Ali ibn Harzihim

Abu Abd Allah ibn Muhammad ibn Harazim (d. 1235/6) from Fez was a Moroccan Sufi leader, pupil of Abu Madyan. Ibn Harazim was the sheikh of Abu-l-Hassan ash-Shadhili, the eponymous founder of the Shadhili tariqat.

Moroccan Sufis
Year of birth unknown
1235 deaths
People from Fez, Morocco
Shadhili order
13th-century Moroccan people